Paul Varley (24 May 1949 – 2 July 2008) was an English musician best known as the drummer in the band Arrows.
Born in Preston, he played on several top 30 hit records, including "Touch Too Much," "My Last Night With You" and "I Love Rock 'N' Roll". Arrows hosted their own TV series, Arrows, on Granada ITV Television in the UK, from 1976 to 1977.

Varley also played with the bands Little Free Rock (earlier called Purple Haze), Ginger Johnson's African Drums, the Terry Reid band, Darling, and the Hitchermen.

Varley had one daughter, Ilona, born in 1977, from his relationship with June Child-Bolan, the former wife of Marc Bolan. In the new millennium Varley moved to London after living in Los Angeles for many years.

Varley died on 2 July 2008 at the age of 59.

External links
 The Arrows official website
 The Arrows Show

1949 births
2008 deaths
English rock drummers
British male drummers
Musicians from Preston, Lancashire
20th-century British male musicians